The Los Alamitos Derby (formerly the Swaps Stakes) is a race for Thoroughbred horses run annually at Los Alamitos Race Course in Los Alamitos, California. The race is open to three-year-old horses and is contested at one and one-eighth miles on the dirt.  A Listed event, it currently carries a purse of $150,000.

Before 2014, the race was called the Swaps Stakes and was run at Hollywood Park Racetrack before its closure in 2013. At that point, it moved to Los Alamitos.

Prior to 1973 Hollywood Park's stakes schedule included the Hollywood Derby (prior to 1959 named the Westerner), a 1 mile stakes run on dirt which tended to attract top 3 year olds. Horses such as Round Table, Bold Reason, and Riva Ridge won the Hollywood Derby after competing in the U.S. Triple Crown. When the Hollywood Derby changed to 1 miles on the turf in 1973, there was no 1 mile dirt race to attract top 3 year olds  from the Triple Crown series. Management decided to add the Swaps Stakes, named in honor of the notable California-bred 1955 Kentucky Derby winner Swaps, to the 1974 July stakes schedule to fill that void. To lure top 3 year olds to enter the Swaps Stakes, at base a $100,000 added event,  provisions were included to increase the purse substantially if one or more Triple Crown race winners participated. This came into play the following year when Belmont Stakes winner Avatar entered which triggered an increase of added purse money to $200,000. In 1977 a $300,000 purse attracted Triple Crown winner Seattle Slew, who suffered the first loss of his career when he ran fourth to winner J O Tobin.

The Hollywood Derby continued as a 1 mile turf stakes through 1975, after which it was moved to earlier in the meeting to serve as a Kentucky Derby prep race at 1 miles on dirt. This prep would serve Affirmed well in 1978 as he would win the Hollywood Derby en route to becoming the 11th Triple Crown champion. The Hollywood Derby became a permanent turf stakes in 1981, contested first at the Hollywood Park Fall Meet, then moving to Del Mar racetrack in 2014 after the closing of Hollywood Park.

Although the inaugural running of the Swaps Stakes was ungraded, it would be contested as a Grade I event from 1975 through 1988. The race was downgraded to a Grade II event in 1989. It regained Grade I in 1999, but this was short-lived as it became a Grade II again in 2002. In 2017, the race was downgraded once more to a Grade III level. Downgraded to Listed in 2022.

Records
Speed record:
 1:59.20 @ 1 miles : Majestic Light (1976)
 1:45.80 @ 1 miles : Free House (1997)

Most wins by a jockey:
 5 - Chris McCarron (1982, 1984, 1986, 1992, 1998)

Most wins by a trainer:
 12 - Bob Baffert (2000, 2001, 2003, 2009, 2012, 2015, 2017, 2018, 2019, 2020, 2021, 2022)

Most wins by an owner:
 3 - Michael Pegram (2000, 2015, 2018, 2020)

Winners

References

 The 2008 Swaps Stakes at the NTRA

Horse races in California
Hollywood Park Racetrack
Los Alamitos, California
Flat horse races for three-year-olds